Planomicrobium (formerly Planococcus) is a genus of gram-positive bacteria. It includes the hydrocarbon-degrading strain P. alkanoclasticum MAE2.

References

Hydrocarbon-degrading bacteria
Bacteria genera